Ig gamma-4 chain C region is a protein that in humans is encoded by the IGHG4 gene.

References

Further reading 

 
 
 
 
 
 
 

Pseudogenes